Neopolyptychus ancylus is a moth of the family Sphingidae. It is known from Nigeria to the Ivory Coast and Guinea.

The wingspan is 28–33 mm for males and 32–35 mm for females.

References

Neopolyptychus
Insects of West Africa
Moths of Africa
Moths described in 1916